Meinrad Berchtold (born 2 September 1943) is a Swiss gymnast. He competed at the 1964 Summer Olympics and the 1968 Summer Olympics.

References

External links
 

1943 births
Living people
Swiss male artistic gymnasts
Olympic gymnasts of Switzerland
Gymnasts at the 1964 Summer Olympics
Gymnasts at the 1968 Summer Olympics
People from Baden, Switzerland
Sportspeople from Aargau